Vale do Paraíso may refer to the following places:

Vale do Paraíso, Rondônia, a municipality in Brazil
Vale do Paraíso (Azambuja), a parish in Portugal